Adan Hospital is the main public general hospital in Al Ahmadi Governorate, Kuwait. Its founded in 1986.

References

External links 
 Website

Hospitals in Kuwait
1986 establishments in Kuwait
Hospitals established in 1986